Parodia tenuicylindrica is a species of cactus from the genus Parodia. The small green cacti have yellow and red-brown spines, white wool and yellow flowers. They produce yellow-green fruit, and black seeds. P. tenuicylindrica can be found growing individually in Rio Grande do Sul, Brazil.

Taxonomy
The species was originally described as Notocactus minimus by Frič & Kruizinger in 1940, based on a description by Bruining. It was later described as Notocactus tenuicylindricus by Friedrich Ritter. Despite objections from hobbyists (among whom Notocactus species were popular) Notocactus (and others) were synonymised under Parodia. In 1997, based on Ritter's earlier description, D. R. Hunt classified the species as Parodia tenuicylindrica.

Description
Parodia tenuicylindrica are cylindrical cacti which are green to blue-green. The plants have 13-21 notched and tuberculate ribs. On top of the tubercles, there are areoles with white wool. The seeds are black oblongs with tubercles.

Distribution
Parodia tenuicylindrica can be found growing solitarily in Rio Grande do Sul, Brazil. It is currently classified as Endangered (EN) on the IUCN Red List, with major threats reported to be fires, cattle grazing due to trampling, agriculture, and forestry.

References

tenuicylindrica
Cacti of South America
Endemic flora of Brazil
Flora of Rio Grande do Sul